Arantxa Sánchez Vicario defeated Monica Seles in the final, 7–6(7–5), 0–6, 6–2 to win the women's singles tennis title at the 1998 French Open. It was Sánchez Vicario's third French Open title, and the last major final for both her and Seles.

Iva Majoli was the defending champion, but lost to Lindsay Davenport in the quarterfinals.

Martina Hingis was attempting to complete a non-calendar-year Grand Slam, having won the preceding Wimbledon, US Open, and Australian Open titles, but lost to Seles in the semifinals.

Seeds

Qualifying

Draw

Finals

Top half

Section 1

Section 2

Section 3

Section 4

Bottom half

Section 5

Section 6

Section 7

Section 8

External links
1998 French Open – Women's draws and results at the International Tennis Federation

Women's Singles
French Open by year – Women's singles
French Open - Women's Singles
1998 in women's tennis
1998 in French women's sport